The Shuibuya Dam is a concrete-face rock-fill embankment dam on the Qingjiang River in Badong County, Enshi, Hubei Province, China. The purpose of the dam is mainly hydroelectricity but it also promotes flood control, navigation, tourism and fishery.

History 
Construction on the Shuibuya Dam was authorized in January 2002 and began soon thereafter. By October 2002, the Qingjiang River had been diverted. In March 2008, the third generator was operational and the dam along with its power station were completed later in 2008. A total of 13,967 people were relocated during construction.

The dam was designed by CWRC and built by Hubei Qingjiang Shuibuya Project Construction Company in addition to the Gezhouba Group Company, Jiangnan Water Resource & Hydropower Engineering Co. and China Water Resource & Hydropower  Bureau. Construction was supervised by Huadong Hydropower Engineering Consultancy Co., Zhongnan Co. and China Water Resource & Hydropower Engineering Consultancy.

Specifications 
The dam includes a bank-type spillway controlled by five  gates that can discharge . The dam's power station contains four  turbines units that are housed in an underground power plant.

See also 

 List of power stations in China

References 

Hydroelectric power stations in Hubei
Enshi Tujia and Miao Autonomous Prefecture
Concrete-face rock-fill dams
Dams in China
Dams completed in 2007
Underground power stations
2008 establishments in China
Energy infrastructure completed in 2008